The men's marathon at the 1971 European Athletics Championships was held in Helsinki, Finland, on 15 August 1971.

Medalists

Results

Final
15 August

Participation
According to an unofficial count, 52 athletes from 21 countries participated in the event.

 (1)
 (3)
 (3)
 (1)
 (3)
 (3)
 (3)
 (3)
 (3)
 (1)
 (3)
 (3)
 (1)
 (3)
 (3)
 (3)
 (3)
 (2)
 (3)
 (3)
 (1)

References

Marathon
Marathons at the European Athletics Championships
Euro
1971 European Athletics
Men's marathons